Vladislav Vasilyev may refer to:

Vladislav Vasilyev (footballer, born 1997), Kazakhstani football midfielder
Vladislav Vasilyev (footballer, born 1999), Russian football midfielder

See also
Vladislav Vasilev, Bulgarian footballer